"'Operator, Long Distance Please" is a song written by Kye Fleming and Dennis Morgan, and recorded by American country music artist Barbara Mandrell.  It was released in August 1982 as the second and final single from the album ...In Black and White.  It peaked at number 9 on the U.S. Billboard Hot Country Singles chart and number 9 on the Canadian RPM Country Tracks chart.

Chart performance

References

1982 singles
1982 songs
Barbara Mandrell songs
Songs written by Kye Fleming
Songs written by Dennis Morgan (songwriter)
Song recordings produced by Tom Collins (record producer)
MCA Records singles